Tony Pecinovsky is a journalist, activist, and politician from St. Louis, Missouri and President of the Saint Louis Workers' Education Society, which was opened in 2014. Pecinovsky is also the author of Let Them Tremble: Biographical Interventions Marking 100 Years of the Communist Party, USA. He regularly speaks at colleges and universities across the U.S.

Biography
Pecinovsky is a member of the Communist Party USA, and serves as the district organizer for the party in Kansas, Missouri and Tennessee.

Pecinovsky is a contributor for People's World, the St. Louis/Southern Illinois Tribune, Labor Tribune, Shelterforce, Z-Magazine, AlterNet, Jacobin, and Political Affairs.

From 2010 to 2015 Pecinovsky served as a member of several local St. Louis political and labor organizations including the United Media Guild, Greater St. Louis CWA City Council, St. Louis Jobs with Justice and served as a delegate to the Greater St. Louis Central Labor Council.

Political career
Pecinovsky is a delegate to the Greater St. Louis Central Labor Council, a member of the Missouri Progressive Coalition board and on the committee of the Missouri Immigrant and Refugee Advocates coalition. Pecinovsky was one of eighteen candidates who publicly opposed the attempted privitazation of the St. Louis Lambert International Airport.

Pecinovsky is a supporter of former Missouri state representative Bruce Franks Jr.

Pecinovsky entered into the field of politics running for St. Louis Board of Aldermen Ward 14 as a Democrat against incumbent Democrat Carol Howard. Pecinovsky lost the March 5th 2019 election 622 votes (47.99%) to Howard's 674 votes (52.01%).

References

American social activists
History of St. Louis
2019 in Missouri
Living people
Missouri Democrats
21st-century American politicians
Politicians from St. Louis
Members of the Communist Party USA
American Marxists
American communists
1977 births
Activists from St. Louis